Canarium mutabile, common name the variable stromb, is a species of sea snail, a marine gastropod mollusk in the family Strombidae, the true conchs.

Description
The shell size varies between 15 mm and 45 mm.

Distribution
This species is distributed in the Red Sea, in the Indian Ocean along Aldabra, the Chagos Atoll, the Comores, Djibouti; the East Coast of South Africa; Eritrea; Kenya ; Madagascar; the Mascarene Basin, Mauritius, Mozambique; Réunion, the Seychelles, Somalia, Tanzania; the Mediterranean Sea; the Pacific Ocean along the Philippines.

Phylogeny

In 2006, Latiolais and colleagues proposed a cladogram (a tree of descent) that attempts to show the phylogenetic relationships of 34 species within the family Strombidae. The authors analysed 31 species in the genus Strombus including Canarium mutabile (referred to as Strombus mutabilis in their analysis), and three species in the allied genus Lambis. The cladogram was based on DNA sequences of both nuclear histone H3 and mitochondrial cytochrome-c oxidase I (COI) protein-coding gene regions. In this proposed phylogeny, Strombus mutabilis (=Canarium mutabile) and Strombus maculatus are closely related and appear to share a common ancestor.

References

External links
 Gastropoda Stromboidea - Ulrich Wieneke and Han Stoutjesdijk
 Canarium mutabile on Gastropoda Stromboidea - Ulrich Wieneke and Han Stoutjesdijk
 

Strombidae
Gastropods described in 1821